Abelhaleem Hasan Abdelraziq Ashqar is a Palestinian Muslim activist who was, briefly, an assistant professor of business at Howard University.  He was convicted of contempt and obstruction of justice for refusal to testify before a grand jury in a trial related to the funding of Hamas by donors in the United States, and was sentenced in November 2007 to 135 months in prison.

Biography 

Ashqar grew up in the West Bank town of Seida. In 1985 he began teaching business administration at the Islamic University of Gaza.  He was the university's director of public relations and edited a university magazine.  Several members of the faculty became leaders of Hamas, causing Israel to close the school.

In 1989 Ashqar Ashqar came from Gaza to the United States on Thomas Jefferson Fellowship funded by the United States Agency for International Development, and   enrolled in the PhD program at the University of Mississippi. He earned his PhD in 1997. As of 1998 Ashqar, 39, continued to be in the U.S. on a student visa.   He taught at Howard University for three years; it was a temporary position as assistant professor.  The university did not renew the contract.

He moved to Northern Virginia in 1997. In 2004 Ashqar was living in Annandale, and/or in Alexandria, Virginia, and was a member of  Virginia's Dar Al-Hijrah mosque and a former member of the mosque's executive committee.  He was on the Mosque's governing committee in 1998.  In 2006 he was interviewed at home in Springfield, Virginia.

Ashqar's student visa expired in 1998 and he applied for political asylum arguing that he would be threatened by Israel should he return home.  On the application he denied any affiliation with Hamas.

Hunger strikes
In 1998 Ashqar was imprisoned by Judge Denise Cote of the  United States District Court for the Southern District of New York for refusing to testify before a Grand Jury probing the involvement of Mousa Abu Marzook in funding Hamas. Ashqar, who was being defended by attorneys from the Center for Constitutional Rights, began a hunger strike in February 1998. In June he was taken to Westchester Medical Center and force-fed.  He was released by the Court in August. His weight dropped from 180 lbs to 120 lbs.

On 5 September 2003, Ashqar who was in a Federal custody for refusing to testify before a grand jury in Chicago, started a second hunger strike.  On 14 September he was transferred to a hospital, bound to a bed, and he received fluids via IV. Ashqar ended his hunger strike in November, and was subsequently released to house arrest.

2005 candidacy for Palestinian Authority Presidency
In 2005, while facing federal charges, Ashqar ran in the elections for the President of the Palestinian National Authority, running in absentia from his home in Virginia. The Australian Broadcasting Corporation described Ashqar as one of eight "long-shot" candidates in the 10 man race. Ashqar placed 4th, with 2.76% of the vote.

Arrest and charges 
Ashqar was arrested in 2004 on federal charges alleging that he was one of three people assisting in the recruitment and fund-raising efforts for Hamas in the United States over the course of 15 years. The arrest was regarded as part of a Bush administration effort to block funding for Hamas, which had been designated by the United States as a terrorist organization in 1995.

He is alleged to have organized meetings with Hamas activists in 1993 Philadelphia and in 1994 in Oxford, Mississippi where he was in graduate school.

Ashqar stood accused of acting as an archivist, collecting and archiving key documents on behalf of Hamas, and facilitating communication among Hamas operatives and members around the world. According to court documents, investigators discovered “a treasure trove of Hamas-related documents,” at Ashqar's home, including details about recent Hamas attacks on Israeli soldiers, the minutes of confidential meetings of Hamas meetings; and a fax from Falls Church, Virginia businessman Mousa Abu Marzook, requesting that Ashqar arrange the transfer of $40,000 to a Palestinian activist. Marzook was deported from the United States in 1997.

Ashqar was accused of using his telephone to accept messages from Hamas agents, and pass them on to agents in other countries. In December 1993, an FBI wiretap documented Ashqar passing a message from an Hamas operative to a senior Hamas official in Syria, that called for Hamas to execute a rogue member. Some of this activity took place in 1992 and 1994, but Hamas was not declared a terrorist organization by the United States until 1995.

Ashqar admitted that he had transferred large sums of money to Hamas, but stated that the sums were intended to assist the Palestinian people, not to arm militants.

Trial and conviction 
At trial, Ashqar was given immunity. Nevertheless, he refused to testify. He was convicted of criminal contempt and obstruction of justice for his refusal to testify before a federal grand jury. According to The Washington Post, the case demonstrates the difficulty of convicting individuals who assist "radical Palestinian organizations", complicated, in this case, by the fact that Hamas was not officially defined as a terrorist organization until 1995. Although Ashqar was recorded discussing violent attacks, he had not been recorded directing violent attacks or recruiting agents to carry out violent attacks. Hamas leader Saleh al-Arouri was an unindicted co-conspirator, described in court documents as having been involved in Ashqar's transfers of money to allegedly benefit Hamas.

References

Sources 
Eggen, Dan, and Markon, Jerry, "Hamas Leader, 2 Others Indicted; Justice Dept. Targets U.S. Fundraising for Militant Group," The Washington Post, August 21, 2004; accessed December 7, 2009
Murphy, Caryle, "Facing New Realities as Islamic Americans," The Washington Post, September 12, 2004, accessed November 6, 2009
Sheridan, Mary Beth, "Palestinian Puzzle; A Business Professor in Springfield Goes on Trial Today On U.S. Charges of Supporting Hamas," The Washington Post, October 19, 2006, accessed November 7, 2009
"Palestinian Activist Out of Jail After Ending Hunger Strike", Fox News, November 3, 2003, accessed December 7, 2009
Eggen, Dan, and Markon, Jerry, "Hamas Leader, 2 Others Indicted; Justice Dept. Targets U.S. Fundraising for Militant Group," The Washington Post, August 21, 2004; accessed December 7, 2009
Murphy, Carle, "Va. Man Certified as Candidate to Replace Arafat; Ashqar Joins Ballot Despite U.S. Charges, Confinement to Home", The Washington Post, December 3, 2004, accessed December 7, 2009
US. v. Marzook, US District Court, N.D. Illinois, Eastern Division, November 17, 2005, accessed December 7, 2009
Bush, Rudolph, and Coen, Jeff, "Hamas-aid case draws split verdict", LA Times, February 2, 2007, accessed December 7, 2009
"Transcript of Sentencing Proceedings," US v. Ashqar, November 21, 2007, accessed December 7, 2009
U.S. v. Ashqar, US Court of Appeals for the Seventh Circuit, October 2, 2009, accessed December 7, 2009

Living people
University of Mississippi alumni
People from Tulkarm Governorate
Palestinian Muslims
Muslim activists
Palestinian Islamists
Howard University faculty
Palestinian people imprisoned abroad
Palestinian Muslim activists
Year of birth missing (living people)
Palestinian emigrants to the United States